Bulbophyllum sect. Racemosae is a section of the genus Bulbophyllum.

Description
Species in this section are creeping epiphytes with shoots developing from the nodes and many flowered inflorescence.

Distribution
Plants from this section are found in Southeast Asia.

Species
Bulbophyllum section  Racemosae comprises the following species:

References

Orchid subgenera